"I Want It Now" is a song recorded by the band Cameo for their 1990 album Real Men... Wear Black. It was released as a single by Atlanta Artists/Mercury Records and reached No. 5 on the US Billboard Hot R&B Singles chart.

Critical reception
People declared "Pushed by a killer bass riff, 'I Want It Now' bubbles like a craterful of lava."
Don Waller of the New York Times found that "Cameo rolls back the rug for a wall-to-off-the-wall dance party, with the house-of-whacks "I Want It Now" and the over-the-counter Afro-desiac "Nan-Yea" providing the most innovative moments. Chris Heim of the Chicago Tribune called the song a "catchy, Sly-styled pop funk tune".

References

1990 singles
Cameo (band) songs
Mercury Records singles
1990 songs
Songs written by Larry Blackmon